An attractant is any chemical that attracts an organism, e.g. i) synthetic lures; ii) aggregation and sex pheromones (intraspecific interactions); and iii) synomone (interspecific interactions)

Synomone 
An interspecific semiochemical that is beneficial to both interacting organisms, the emitter and receiver, e.g. floral synomone of certain Bulbophyllum species (Orchidaceae) attracts fruit fly males (Tephritidae: Diptera) as pollinators. In this true mutualistic inter-relationship, both organisms gain benefits in their respective sexual reproduction - i.e. orchid flowers are pollinated and the Dacini fruit fly males are rewarded with a sex pheromone precursor or booster; and the floral synomones, also act as rewards to pollinators, are in the form of phenylpropanoids (e.g. methyl eugenol) and phenylbutanoids (e.g. raspberry ketone  zingerone and anisyl acetone/a combination of the three phenylbutanoids.

References 
 

Chemical ecology
Semiochemicals